Parallel coordinates are a common way of visualizing and analyzing high-dimensional datasets.

To show a set of points in an n-dimensional space, a backdrop is drawn consisting of n parallel lines, typically vertical and equally spaced. A point in n-dimensional space is represented as a polyline with vertices on the parallel axes; the position of the vertex on the i-th axis corresponds to the i-th coordinate of the point.

This visualization is closely related to time series visualization, except that it is applied to data where the axes do not correspond to points in time, and therefore do not have a natural order. Therefore, different axis arrangements may be of interest.

History 

Parallel coordinates were often said to be invented by Philbert Maurice d'Ocagne in 1885, but even though the words "Coordonnées parallèles" appear in the book title this work has nothing to do with the visualization techniques of the same name; the book only describes a method of coordinate transformation. But even before 1885, parallel coordinates were used, for example in Henry Gannetts "General Summary, Showing the Rank of States, by Ratios, 1880", or afterwards in Henry Gannetts "Rank of States and Territories in Population at Each Census, 1790-1890" in 1898. They were  popularised again 87 years later by Alfred Inselberg in 1985 and systematically developed as a coordinate system starting from 1977. Some important applications are in collision avoidance algorithms for air traffic control (1987—3 USA patents), data mining (USA patent), computer vision (USA patent), Optimization, process control, more recently in intrusion detection and elsewhere.

Higher dimensions
On the plane with an xy cartesian coordinate system, adding more dimensions in parallel coordinates (often abbreviated ||-coords or PCP) involves adding more axes. The value of parallel coordinates is that certain geometrical properties in high dimensions transform into easily seen 2D patterns. For example, a set of points on a line in n-space transforms to a set of polylines in parallel coordinates all intersecting at n − 1 points. For n = 2 this yields a point-line duality pointing out why the mathematical foundations of parallel coordinates are developed in the projective rather than euclidean space. A pair of lines intersects at a unique point which has two coordinates and, therefore, can correspond to a unique line which is also specified by two parameters (or two points). By contrast, more than two points are required to specify a curve and also a pair of curves may not have a unique intersection. Hence by using curves in parallel coordinates instead of lines, the point line duality is lost together with all the other properties of projective geometry, and the known nice higher-dimensional patterns corresponding to (hyper)planes, curves, several smooth (hyper)surfaces, proximities, convexity and recently non-orientability. The goal is to map n-dimensional relations into 2D patterns. Hence, parallel coordinates is not a point-to-point mapping but rather a nD subset to 2D subset mapping, there is no loss of information. Note: even a point in nD is not mapped into a point in 2D, but to a polygonal line—a subset of 2D.

Statistical considerations

When used for statistical data visualisation there are three important considerations: the order, the rotation, and the scaling of the axes.

The order of the axes is critical for finding features, and in typical data analysis many reorderings will need to be tried.  Some authors have come up with ordering heuristics which may create illuminating orderings.

The rotation of the axes is a translation in the parallel coordinates and if the lines intersected outside the parallel axes it can be translated between them by rotations. The simplest example of this is rotating the axis by 180 degrees.

Scaling is necessary because the plot is based on interpolation (linear combination) of consecutive pairs of variables. Therefore, the variables must be in common scale, and there are many scaling methods to be considered as part of data preparation process that can reveal more informative views.

A smooth parallel coordinate plot is achieved with splines. In the smooth plot, every observation is mapped into a parametric line (or curve), which is smooth, continuous on the axes, and orthogonal to each parallel axis. This design emphasizes the quantization level for each data attribute.

Reading 
Inselberg made a full review of how to visually read out parallel coords' relational patterns. When most lines between two parallel axis are somewhat parallel to each other, it suggests a positive relationship between these two dimensions. When lines cross in a kind of superposition of X-shapes, it's a negative relationship. When lines cross randomly or are parallel, it shows there is no particular relationship.

Limitations 
In parallel coordinates, each axis can have at most two neighboring axes (one on the left, and one on the right). For a d-dimensional data set, at most d-1 relationships can be shown at a time. In time series visualization, there exists a natural predecessor and successor; therefore in this special case, there exists a preferred arrangement. However, when the axes do not have a unique order, finding a good axis arrangement requires the use of heuristics and experimentation. In order to explore more complex relationships, axes must be reordered.

By arranging the axes in 3-dimensional space (however, still in parallel, like nails in a nail bed), an axis can have more than two neighbors in a circle around the central attribute, and the arrangement problem gets easier (for example by using a minimum spanning tree). A prototype of this visualization is available as extension to the data mining software ELKI. However, the visualization is harder to interpret and interact with than a linear order.

Software 
While there are a large number of papers about parallel coordinates, there are only few notable software publicly available to convert databases into parallel coordinates graphics. Notable software are ELKI, GGobi, Mondrian, Orange and ROOT. Libraries include Protovis.js, D3.js provides basic examples. D3.Parcoords.js (a D3-based library) specifically dedicated to parallel coordinates graphic creation has also been published. The Python data structure and analysis library Pandas implements parallel coordinates plotting, using the plotting library matplotlib.

Other visualizations for multivariate data 
 Radar chart – a visualization with coordinate axes arranged radially
 Andrews plot – the Fourier transform of a parallel coordinates graph

References

Further reading

 Heinrich, Julian and Weiskopf, Daniel (2013) State of the Art of Parallel Coordinates, Eurographics 2013 - State of the Art Reports, pp. 95–116
 Moustafa, Rida (2011)  Parallel coordinate and parallel coordinate density plots, Wiley Interdisciplinary Reviews: Computational Statistics, Vol 3(2), pp. 134–148.
 Weidele, Daniel Karl I. (2019) Conditional Parallel Coordinates, IEEE Visualization Conference (VIS) 2019, pp. 221–225

External links
 Alfred Inselberg's Homepage, with Visual Tutorial, History, Selected Publications and Applications
 An Investigation of Methods for Visualising Highly Multivariate Datasets by C. Brunsdon, A. S. Fotheringham & M. E. Charlton, University of Newcastle, UK
Using Curves to Enhance Parallel Coordinate Visualisations  by Martin Graham & Jessie Kennedy, Napier University, Edinburgh, UK
Parallel Coordinates, a tutorial by Robert Kosara
Conditional Parallel Coordinates – Recursive variant of Parallel Coordinates, where a categorical value can expand to reveal another level of Parallel Coordinates.

Data visualization
Multi-dimensional geometry
Statistical charts and diagrams